The Spanish or White-faced Black Spanish,  or , is a breed of domestic chicken which originated in Spain, but was largely bred to its present type in Great Britain in the eighteenth century. It is an older breed than the Minorca. It is distributed throughout the world, but is rare in Spain.

History

This breed was admitted into the American Poultry Association in 1874.

Characteristics 
They have glossy black plumage and are closely related to the Minorca and Castellana Negra breeds.  Their most distinguishing feature are their white, low-hanging ear-lobes, which are actually overdeveloped.  They have a single comb, four toes, and no crest.

Use

Hens are non-sitters, and lay 160–180 white eggs per year, with a weight of about

References 

Chicken breeds
Chicken breeds originating in Spain
Animal breeds on the RBST Watchlist